Abu Abud (also Romanized as Abū ‘Abūd; also known as Rūstā-ye Abū ‘Ayūd) is a village in Nasar Rural District, Arvandkenar District, Abadan County, Khuzestan Province, Iran. At the 2006 census, its population was 303, in 64 families.

References 

Populated places in Abadan County